"Take It Back" is a song by the progressive rock band Pink Floyd, released as the seventh track on their 1994 album The Division Bell. It was also released as a single on 16 May 1994, the first from the album, and Pink Floyd's first for seven years. The music for the song was written by guitarist David Gilmour and album co-producer Bob Ezrin, with lyrics by Gilmour, his wife Polly Samson and Nick Laird-Clowes.

Equipment
Guitarist David Gilmour used an E-bow on a Gibson J-200 acoustic guitar that is processed through a Zoom effects box, then directly injected into the board.

The lyrics include a common British reading of the nursery rhyme "Ring a Ring o' Roses" during its instrumental section.

Personnel
David Gilmour – lead vocals, guitar, Ebow
Richard Wright – keyboards, Hammond and Farfisa organs
Nick Mason – drums, percussion

Additional musicians:

Tim Renwick – additional guitar
Jon Carin – Synthesizers, keyboards, loops
Guy Pratt – bass
Bob Ezrin – keyboards, percussion
Sam Brown – backing vocals
Durga McBroom – backing vocals
Carol Kenyon – backing vocals
Jackie Sheridan – backing vocals
Rebecca Leigh-White – backing vocals

Charts

Weekly charts

Year-end charts

References

External links

1994 singles
1990s ballads
Pink Floyd songs
Rock ballads
Songs written by David Gilmour
Songs written by Bob Ezrin
Songs written by Nick Laird-Clowes
Song recordings produced by Bob Ezrin
Songs with lyrics by Polly Samson
Song recordings produced by David Gilmour
1994 songs
EMI Records singles
Columbia Records singles